The Fantaisie for piano and orchestra, Op. 111, is a concertante composition written by Gabriel Fauré in 1918.

History 
The idea of a concertante work for piano and orchestra came indirectly from Debussy, who had written to his publisher Jacques Durand that he was thinking of a series of Concerts for piano and various instrumental groups. After Debussy's death in 1918, Durand suggested the idea to Fauré.

By 8 September, Fauré was almost done with the piece, writing to his wife: "I've almost finished my piece for piano and orchestra. I seem to work more quickly and easily as I grow older... I must say the news of the war has cheered me, as I expect it has to you." Fauré's biographer Jean-Michel Nectoux suggests that Fauré asked Marcel Samuel-Rousseau to orchestrate the piece under his supervision, as his hearing was getting worse.

The Fantaisie was dedicated to Alfred Cortot, who had asked Fauré as far back as 1902 to write a concertante work for him. The first performance in Paris was given by Cortot on 14 May 1919 at a concert of the Société Nationale de Musique in the Salle Gaveau.

Cortot later wrote an article in which he expressed his reservations about the work, in particular the "lack of brilliance" in the solo part and the "shortage of contrasts" between it and the orchestra.

Music 

Though a romantic work, the Fantaisie is scored for a rather modestly sized orchestra of two flutes, two oboes, two clarinets, two bassoons, four horns, two trumpets, timpani, harp, strings, and solo piano. Nectoux notes that the relationship between soloist and orchestra is similar to the orchestration of the Ballade, written thirty years earlier: "the soloist takes first place – as a principal, we might say – while the power and colour of the orchestra serve to underline the argument. The strings are used almost throughout to accompany the piano but the woodwind are often treated as soloists"

The work consists of three interconnected movements, played without interruption:

See also 
 Fantaisie for piano and orchestra (Debussy)

References

External links 
 

Compositions by Gabriel Fauré
Compositions for piano and orchestra
1918 compositions
Compositions in G major
Music with dedications
Fantasias (music)